Christopher Hughes Edward Charles Lavy (August 16, 1842, in Hamburg – May 10, 1928) was a German industrialist and politician, best remembered as proprietor of Charles Lavy & Company. He served as member of the Hamburg Parliament from 1882 to 1910.

References 

1842 births
1928 deaths
German industrialists
German politicians